Milton Township, Ohio may refer to several places:

Milton Township, Ashland County, Ohio
Milton Township, Jackson County, Ohio
Milton Township, Mahoning County, Ohio
Milton Township, Wayne County, Ohio
Milton Township, Wood County, Ohio

See also
Milton Township (disambiguation)

Ohio township disambiguation pages